Argentina men's national softball team is the national team for Argentina. The team competed at the 1992 ISF Men's World Championship in Manila, Philippines where they finished with 6 wins and 2 losses.   The team competed at the 1996 ISF Men's World Championship in Midland, Michigan where they finished with 7 wins and 3 losses. The team competed at the 2004 ISF Men's World Championship in Christchurch, New Zealand where they finished eighth.  The team competed at the 2009 ISF Men's World Championship in Saskatoon, Saskatchewan where they finished seventh.

References

Men's national softball teams
softball
Softball in Argentina
Men's sport in Argentina